The 2003 IIHF InLine Hockey World Championship was the seventh IIHF InLine Hockey World Championship, the premier annual international inline hockey tournament. It took place in Nuremberg and Amberg, Germany, with the gold-medal game played on July 19, 2003.

Championship

Preliminary round

Group A

Group B

Playoff round

Qualifiers

Quarterfinals

Placement games
7th place game

5th place game

Semifinals

Bronze medal game

Gold medal game

Division I

Preliminary round

Group C

Group D

Playoff round

Quarterfinals

Placement games
15th place game

13th place game

Semifinals

3rd place game (11th overall)

Final (9th overall)

References

IIHF InLine Hockey World Championship
2003 in inline hockey